Douglas station is an elevated light rail station on the C Line of the Los Angeles Metro Rail system. It is located over Douglas Street, after which it is named, near Park Place and one block north of Rosecrans Avenue in El Segundo, California.

The original name for the station was Douglas St/Rosecrans Ave, but was later simplified to Douglas. This station was renovated in 2006 as part of street improvements in the area.

The train platform, currently suitable for two-car trains, may be lengthened to accommodate three-car trains to enable increased capacity of the line.

Service

Station layout

Hours and frequency

Connections 
, the following connections are available:
 Beach Cities Transit: 109
 Los Angeles Metro Bus:

References 

C Line (Los Angeles Metro) stations
El Segundo, California
Railway stations in the United States opened in 1995
1995 establishments in California